Bamfurlong may refer to:

 Bamfurlong, Gloucestershire a village in Gloucestershire, England
 Bamfurlong, Greater Manchester a village in the Metropolitan Borough of Wigan, Greater Manchester, England
 Bamfurlong (Middle-earth), a fictional place in the books of J. R. R. Tolkien